Phoenix Military Academy is a public military high school in Chicago Illinois, United States.

History 
Phoenix Military Academy, (Commonly abbreviated as PMA) was founded in 2004 and originally located in the same building as Orr Academy High School. It has since been moved to Grant Campus or the older location of Orr.

Academics 
All students are required to attain 24 credits to graduate. In addition to usual core subjects such as English and the sciences, students also take two years of foreign language, Two years of the arts and are mandated to take classes to prepare for ROTC.

In June 2015, it was announced that PMA was awarded a $6 million DOD grant for a new STEM and Leadership Academy Pilot Program.

References

External links 
School Website

Public high schools in Chicago
Military high schools in the United States
2004 establishments in Illinois
Educational institutions established in 2004